The National Australia Day Council (NADC) is a non-profit social enterprise owned by the Australian Government and is the national coordinating body for the Australian of the Year awards and Australia Day. It was established in 1979 and incorporated as a government-owned business in 1990.

Australian Natives' Association was one of the chief promoters of Australia Day as a national holiday, and in 1946 formed an Australia Day Celebrations Committee in Melbourne to formalise its efforts. Similar bodies emerged in other states, and a Federal Australia Day Council (FADC) was formed to coordinate their efforts. In 1979, with the FADC's agreement, the organisation was replaced by a government-sponsored National Australia Day Committee. The committee was initially headed by former Olympian Herb Elliott. In 1985, it was renamed the National Australia Day Council, with former tennis player John Newcombe as president. The organisation became an incorporated public company in 1990.

Structure and aims
The NADC heads a network of state and territory Australia Day affiliate organisations and local Australia Day committees and is designed to inspire national pride and spirit, and to enrich the life of all Australians. It aims to promote the meaning of Australia Day through activity, education, reflection, discussion and debate and to promote good citizenship, values and achievement by recognising excellence and service to the nation.

Headquarters
The NADC is housed at Old Parliament House, Canberra. The current chair is Danielle Roche, and the chief executive officer is Karlie Brand.

Chair of the National Australia Day Council
The following individuals have served as Chair of the National Australia Day Council:

References

External links
 Australia Day website
Australian of the Year website
About the National Australia Day Council

Commonwealth Government-owned companies of Australia
Social enterprises
1990 establishments in Australia
Organizations established in 1990